Rubén Ramírez Hidalgo and Santiago Ventura were the defending champions, but they chose not to compete this year.Miloslav Mečíř Jr. and Marek Semjan won in final 3–6, 6–1, [13–11] against Hocevar and Zampieri.

Seeds

Draw

Draw

References
 Doubles Draw

Kosice Open - Doubles
2010 Doubles